Melina Rai is a Nepalese singer. She received the Best Playback Singer Female award at the Radio Kantipur Awards 2017.

Early life and career
Trained by her father in the art of music since the age of ten, Rai recorded her first Nepali song at the age of 12 and her career started with the song "Kammar Mathi Patuki" in 2015. Her notable songs include, ‘Timle Bato Fereu Arey’, ‘Shiraima Shirbandi’, ‘Chapakkai Ful Fulyo’ and latest hits ‘Kutu ma Kutu’ and ‘Machhile Khane Kholiko Leu.’

She received the Best Playback Singer Female award at the Radio Kantipur Awards in 2017.

In September 2018, Rai released her song, 'Kati Ma Samjhu'.

In April 2022, she revealed her engagement with Sanjiv Baraili (सञ्जिव बराईली). She told that her engagement actually did take place in 2019 AD. Baraili also belongs to Nepali Music Industry.

References

External links
Saptahik Models – Melina Rai

Nepali-language singers
Nepali-language singers from India
People from Darjeeling
Living people
Nepalese playback singers
Rai people
1993 births